Convent Datuk Keramat is a school located in George Town, Penang, Malaysia. The school is an all-girls Chinese school with primary and secondary school within the same compound. The Primary School is one of the 40 Convent primary schools in Malaysia while the Secondary School is one of the 30 Convent secondary schools in Malaysia. Among these schools, there are only 3 Chinese schools in Peninsular Malaysia, one in Penang, one in Ipoh and one in Malacca. (all with Primary and Secondary Schools)

Location
SRJK (C) and SMJK Convent Datuk Keramat is situated at 421, Dato Keramat Road, 10150 Georgetown, Penang.

The geographical coordinates of the school is 5N 24' 43.00", 100E 19' 4.00"  or N 5.4119444, E 100.31777777777778 in decimal degree.

History
The school of Convent Datuk Keramat was founded by Rev. Mother Tarcisius on 14 January 1935. Rev. Mother Tarcisius believed that education should not be limited to English only but should be provided according to the needs of the society. Hence the school was opened as the Convent Chinese School with 12 kindergarten and primary students at a house in Dato Keramat Road. Within six months, the number of students increased to 75 and was split to 3 classes. The teachers at the time were Sr. St. Henry, Sr. St. Agnes and Ms. Chang Zhi Qing.

In 1938, the school bought a building which became no. 421, Dato Keramat Road of today.  By 1940, the school had 300 students. The school expanded the building of that time to 14 more classrooms to accommodate the increasing number of students and created classes for the students primary education.

In 1941, Japanese soldiers took over Penang and all Chinese schools were forced to close. After a tough 3 years and 8 months, World War II ended in 1945 and schools reopened. However, Convent Chinese School did not accept boys any more and became the all-girls school of today.

In 1947, the school created a secondary school from some of the primary school building which is now known as SMJK Convent Datuk Keramat. Both schools shared the same compound and school canteen.

In 1950, the school introduced education in English and business subject classes.

In 1954, 12 classrooms were built behind the compound of the school for the use of the secondary school. It is then that the primary and secondary school administration was separated, and Sr. John of the Cross was given the administration of the secondary school.

In 1959,  a multipurpose hall, art and living skills classrooms, secondary science classrooms and staff office were built. By then, the school had 1,200 primary students and 1,100 secondary students.

In 1976, the primary school old building since 1954 was refurbished to a three-storey centre block while the two-storey wing building remained unchanged.

In 1984, a four-storey building for the secondary school was added. The building houses a canteen, a larger multipurpose hall, more classrooms and a library. By this time, the secondary school had 1093 students, 57 teachers and 50 classrooms.

In 2007, the old double-storey secondary school building which was built in 1954 was demolished and reconstructed with a four-storey building that comprises a big meeting hall, a multi-purpose recreational activity area, 24 new classrooms, 8 science laboratories/cooking classrooms/social science classrooms.

In 2016, a new fifth level that comprises ten classrooms was added at the existing four-storey building. Two units of 15-passenger high-tech lifts were constructed between the two buildings. A new basketball/volleyball court with illuminations was also constructed in the middle of the Secondary School field.

School logo
The school logo is of the Convents of the Infant Jesus. The symbolism of the badge is as relevant today as it has been over the centuries. The centre of the badge with Chinese character of Convent in short form is red. Red traditionally conveys the message of love. The shield is surmounted by a five pointed golden star and encircled by a garland of Marguerites with the motto – SIMPLE IN VIRTUE, STEADFAST IN DUTY. This five pointed star represents the five principles of the Rukun Negara: 

BELIEF IN GOD

LOYALTY TO KING AND COUNTRY

UPHOLDING THE CONSTITUTION

RESPECT OF THE LAW

GOOD BEHAVIOUR AND MORALITY  

The garland of marguerites is symbolic of purity and simplicity.

Motto
Simple in Virtue, Steadfast in Duty
()
″Tulus Dengan Fadilat, Azam Dengan Bakti″

Pengetua (secondary school)

Pengerusi (Board of Governors secondary school)

See also
 Education in Penang
 Convent school
 SMK Convent Bukit Nanas
 Convent of the Holy Infant Jesus, Singapore

External links

References 

Girls' schools in Malaysia
Primary schools in Malaysia
Secondary schools in Malaysia
Convent of the Holy Infant Jesus schools
Chinese-language schools in Malaysia
Buildings and structures in George Town, Penang
Catholic schools in Malaysia
Educational institutions established in 1935
1935 establishments in British Malaya
Publicly funded schools in Malaysia
Schools in Penang